John Stanes (15 December 1910 – 2 September 1997) was an Australian cricketer. He played five first-class cricket matches for Victoria between 1932 and 1938.

See also
 List of Victoria first-class cricketers

References

External links
 

1910 births
1997 deaths
Australian cricketers
Victoria cricketers
Cricketers from Melbourne